Pulau Muara Besar Bridge is a dual-carriageway bridge which connects Pulau Muara Besar, an island on Brunei Bay, with the mainland of Brunei via Serasa in Brunei-Muara District. The construction began in 2015 and completed in May 2018; it was undertaken by China Harbour Engineering Company at a cost of B$260 million or US$204 million. The bridge is part of the road infrastructure that will serve the petrochemical refinery plant on the island, which is currently under construction, and is a Chinese foreign direct investment. At present, access to the bridge is restricted to authorised personnels of the project.

References 

Bridges in Brunei